Aspergillus domesticus is a species of fungus in the genus Aspergillus. It is from the Robusti section. The species was first described in 2017. It has been isolated from wallpaper and a museum piece in the Netherlands. It has been reported to produce asperphenamate.

References 

domesticus
Fungi described in 2017